Slums in South Africa exist in all cities. There are also rural informal settlements. The slums are listed below under the city or town they are nearest to.

Amanzimtoti
KwaMakhutha

Blue Downs
Mfuleni

Cape Town

Bonteheuwel
Crossroads, Western Cape
Dunoon, Cape Town
Flamingo Crescent
Gugulethu
Joe Slovo (Cape Town)
Khayelitsha
Langa, Western Cape
Mitchells Plain- 310,485 inhabitants in 2011.
Nyanga, Western Cape
Philippi, Western Cape
Santini

Durban
Chatsworth
Inanda
Kennedy Road
KwaDabeka
KwaMashu - 175,663 inhabitants in 2011.
Ntuzuma
Piesangriver

Durbanville
Fisantekraal
Klipheuwel

East London, Eastern Cape
Mdantsane - 156,835 inhabitants in 2011.

Fish Hoek
Masiphumelele

George, Western Cape

Thembalethu

Hout Bay
Imizamo Yethu

Johannesburg
Alexandra - 179,624 inhabitants in 2011.
Kanana Park
Soweto - 1,271,628 inhabitants in 2011.

Kraaifontein
Bloekombos
Wallacedene

Paarl
Mbekweni

Port Elizabeth
Ibhayi - 237,799 inhabitants in 2011.
Motherwell

Port Shepstone
Gamalakhe

Rustenburg
Freedom Park, North West - estimated size 25,000 people in 2008.

Stellenbosch
Enkanini
Kayamandi

Strand, Western Cape
Lwandle
Nomzamo

See also

 List of slums
 Urbanization in Africa

References

Slums
South Africa
Slums in South Africa
Squatting in South Africa